This is a list of Christian organisations in New Zealand.

Denominations and Churches
Anglican Church in Aotearoa, New Zealand and Polynesia
ACTS Churches NZ (formerly the Apostolic Church Movement of New Zealand)
Alliance Churches of New Zealand (The Christian & Missionary Alliance of NZ)
 Harmony Church, Christchurch 
Arise Church New Zealand 
City Church Christchurch 
Equippers Church 
Roman Catholic Church in New Zealand
Lutheran church of New Zealand
 Congregational Christian Church of Samoa (Ekalesia Fa'apotopotoga Kerisiano Samoa)
Congregational LMS Samoan Church (Ekalesia LMS Toefuataina Samoa)
Presbyterian Church of Aotearoa New Zealand
Majestic Church
Methodist Church of New Zealand
Metropolitan Community Church
Baptist Union of New Zealand
The Church of Jesus Christ of Latter-day Saints in New Zealand
Ratana
Ringatu
Assemblies of God in New Zealand
Samoan Assemblies of God in New Zealand Incorporated
Vineyard Churches Aotearoa New Zealand
Salvation Army in New Zealand
Christian Brethren Assemblies in New Zealand
Wesleyan Methodist Church in New Zealand
Antiochian Orthodox Archdiocese of Australia, New Zealand, and All Oceania
Coptic Orthodox Church in Australia and New Zealand
New Life Churches, New Zealand
North Shore Church of Christ in Auckland New Zealand
Grace Presbyterian Church of New Zealand
Orthodox Presbyterian Church of New Zealand
Greek Orthodox Archdiocese of Australia and New Zealand
Reformed Churches of New Zealand
Anabaptist Association of Australia and New Zealand
Pentecostal Church of New Zealand
Destiny Church
Revival Centres International
City Impact Church New Zealand
Church of the Nazarene in New Zealand
LinkNZ
LIFE (church)
Religious Society of Friends
 The Way Of The Cross Ministries New Zealand  www.thewayofthecross.info
Reformed Old Catholic Church in New Zealand (Te Hāhi Katorika Tawhito)

Ecumenical Organisations
Bible Society in New Zealand
 Christian World Service
 Churches Education Commission
 Church Women United
 Fellowship of the Least Coin
 Interchurch Hospital Chaplaincy Council
 Student Christian Movement
 Te Runanga Whakawhanaunga I nga Haahi
 Uniting Congregations of Aotearoa New Zealand
 Unity Dialogue

Parachurch Organisations

Parachurch organizations are Christian faith-based organizations that work outside and across denominations to engage in social welfare and evangelism. Parachurch organizations seek to come alongside the church and specialize in things that individual churches may not be able to specialize in by themselves.

Youth 

 Eastercamp, South Island

Media 

 Rhema Media
 Christian Broadcasting Association
 Word of Life Ministries 
 Parachute Music

International Aid 
 International Needs New Zealand
 Celebrate Messiah New Zealand

 Derek Prince Ministries NZ
Focus on the Family New Zealand
God Talk
 Hagar New Zealand
 Liberty Trust 
MMM New Zealand 
Scripture Union New Zealand
Shining Lights
Society of St Pius X in New Zealand
Student Life New Zealand
TEAR Fund NZ
Tertiary Students Christian Fellowship
World Vision New Zealand
Voice of the Martyrs New Zealand

Social Service Organisations
Baptist Community Ministries
Catholic Social Services
Canterbury Youth Services
Christchurch City Mission
Methodist Social Services
New Zealand Council of Christian Social Services
 Presbyterian Support
Wesley Community Action
24-7 YouthWork Trust

Educational Organisations

Theological and Bible Colleges

Denominational
Arise Church Ministry School
Alphacrucis (Assemblies of God)
Bishopdale Theological College (Anglican)
Booth College of Mission (Salvation Army)
Catholic Institute of Theology
Carey Baptist College
Equippers College (ACTS Churches NZ)
Good Shepherd College (Catholic)
Holy Cross Seminary (Catholic)
Holy Name Seminary (Catholic) (closed)
Knox Centre for Ministry and Leadership (Presbyterian)
Marist Seminary (Catholic)
Ministry Training College of New Zealand (Elim)
Pathways College of Bible & Mission
St John's College, Auckland (Anglican)
St Mary's Seminary (Catholic) (1850-1869)
South Pacific Bible College (Church of Christ)
Theology House Christchurch (Anglican)
Trinity Methodist Theological College
Vision College New Zealand (ACTS Churches NZ)

Ecumenical
Ecumenical Institute of Distance Theological Studies

Non-denominational
Calvary Chapel Bible Institute 
Capernwray New Zealand 
Faith Bible College
Grace Theological College
Gospel Training Trust
Laidlaw College
Lifeway College
New Covenant International Bible College
The Shepherd's Bible College
Theology Programme, University of Otago 
World Gospel Bible College

Religious orders
 Sisters of St Joseph of Nazareth

Primary and Secondary schools

Catholic Church

Primary schools
 190 Catholic primary schools

Secondary schools

Aquinas College
Baradene College of the Sacred Heart
Bishop Viard College
Campion College
Carmel College
Catholic Cathedral College
Chanel College
Cullinane College
De La Salle College
Francis Douglas Memorial College
Garin College
Hato Paora College
Hato Petera College
John Paul College
John Paul II High School
Kavanagh College
Liston College
Marcellin College
Marian College
Marist College
McAuley High School
Pompallier Catholic College
Roncalli College
Rosmini College
Sacred Heart College, Auckland
Sacred Heart College, Napier
Sacred Heart Girls' College, Hamilton
Sacred Heart College, Lower Hutt
Sacred Heart Girls' College, New Plymouth
St Bede's College
St Bernard's College
St Catherine's College
St Dominic's College
St John's College, Hamilton
St John's College, Hastings
St Joseph's Māori Girls' College
St Kevin's College
St Mary's College, Auckland
St Mary's College, Wellington
St. Patrick's College, Silverstream
St. Patrick's College, Wellington
St Paul's College
St Peter's College, Auckland
St Peter's College, Palmerston North
St Peter's College, Gore
St Thomas of Canterbury College
Sancta Maria College
Verdon College
Villa Maria College

Anglican

Primary schools
Cathedral Grammar School
 Churton St. James, Lower Hutt
King's School (Auckland)
 Medbury School, Christchurch
 St. John's School, Invercargill
 St. Mark's School, Christchurch
 St. Mark's School, Wellington
 St. Matthew's School, Hastings
St Michael's Church School
 Selwyn House, Christchurch
Southwell School

Secondary schools
Christ's College, Christchurch
 Craighead Diocesan School, Timaru
 Dilworth School, Auckland
Diocesan School for Girls, Auckland
 Hukarere Girls' College
King's College, Auckland
Nga Tawa Diocesan School
Rathkeale College
 St. Hilda's Collegiate, Dunedin
 St. Margaret's College, Christchurch
 St. Matthew's Collegiate, Masterton
St Paul's Collegiate School
 St. Peter's College, Cambridge
Samuel Marsden Collegiate School
Taranaki Diocesan School for Girls, Stratford
 Te Aute College, Hawke's Bay
Waikato Diocesan School
 Wellesley College, Eastbourne
 Woodford House, Havelock North

Methodist
Wesley College, Auckland

Non-denominational
Bethlehem College, Tauranga
Elim Christian College
Faith Academy (New Zealand)
Hastings Christian School, Hastings, New Zealand
Hebron Christian College, Auckland
Immanuel Christian School, New Zealand
Middleton Grange School
St. Dominic's College, Wanganui

Presbyterian
Columba College
Iona College, Havelock North
John McGlashan College
Queen Margaret College, Wellington
St. Andrew's College, Christchurch
St Cuthbert's College, Auckland
Saint Kentigern College
Saint Oran's College, Lower Hutt
Scots College, Wellington
Solway College

See also
Christianity in New Zealand

References 

 
 
New Zealand religion-related lists
New Zealand